Equinox Day may refer to:

The day the equinox falls upon.
Autumnal Equinox Day (September in Japan)
Vernal Equinox Day (March in Japan)

See also
 Equinox (disambiguation)